Synchronic may refer to:

Synchronic (film), a 2019 American science fiction film starring Jamie Dornan and Anthony Mackie
Synchronic analysis, the analysis of a language at a specific point of time
Synchronicity, the experience of two or more events that are apparently causally unrelated or unlikely to occur together by chance, yet are experienced as occurring together in a meaningful manner
Synchronization, the coordination of events to operate a system in unison

See also 
Synchrony (disambiguation)
Synchronicity (disambiguation)
Synchronizer (disambiguation)
Diachronic (disambiguation)